Mark Winkler (born 29 January 1966) is a South African writer of literary fiction living in Cape Town. He is the author of two novels, An Exceptionally Simple Theory of Absolutely Everything (2013) and Wasted (2015). His third novel, The Safest Place You Know, is due to be published in September 2016.

Life 

Winkler was born in Johannesburg in 1966. He grew up in what is now Mpumalanga and attended high school at St. Alban's College, Pretoria. He graduated from Rhodes University, Grahamstown, with a Bachelor of Journalism in 1990.

Works

Novels 

His first novel, An Exceptionally Simple Theory of Absolutely Everything, has been described as “an intensely absorbing and unapologetically apolitical tale”, and “remarkable in its refusal to conform to ideas of what a South African novel should be”.

His second novel, the  Wasted, was longlisted for the 2016 Sunday Times Barry Ronge Fiction Prize. Wasted has been described as “tense, darkly humorous, unpredictable and thought-provoking”, “one of the year’s most ambitious, suspenseful, tightly controlled and expertly executed novels”.

Short Stories 

Winkler’s short story, When I Came Home, was shortlisted for the 2016 Commonwealth Writer’s Prize, one of 26 stories to be selected out of almost 4,000 submissions from 47 countries.

His short story, Ink, was awarded third prize in the 2016 Short Story Day Africa competition and was published in the anthology Water.

Winkler is a member of PEN South Africa.

Published works 

 
 
 Ink, Water, Short Story Day Africa, 2016
 When I came home, adda, Commonwealth Writers, May 2016

References

External links
Tibor Jones
PEN South Africa

1966 births
Living people
South African male novelists
Rhodes University alumni
People from Johannesburg
Writers from Cape Town
21st-century South African novelists
21st-century South African male writers